Tees Bay is a bay in County Durham, England, between Hartlepool and Redcar, where the River Tees flows into the North Sea.

References

Bays of England
Landforms of County Durham
Bays of North Yorkshire